Chômeur is French for unemployed person. It may also refer to:

 Chômeur, a grammatical term to describe an element of a sentence that has been "demoted"
 Pouding chômeur, a dessert from Quebec
 Tichumaren or Tishoumaren, a style of music in Northern Africa